Australian feral camels are feral populations of dromedaries (Camelus dromedarius) in Australia. Imported from British India and Afghanistan during the 19th century for transport and construction during the colonisation of the central and western parts of Australia, many were released into the wild after motorised transport replaced the use of camels in the early 20th century, resulting in a fast-growing feral population.

By 2008, it was [incorrectly] feared that Central Australia's feral camel population had grown to about one million and was projected to double every 8 to 10 years. Camels are known to cause serious degradation of local environmental and cultural sites, particularly during dry conditions. Pastoralists, representatives from the Central Land Council, and Aboriginal land holders in the relevant areas were those amongst the complainants. An AU$19 million culling program was funded in 2009, and by 2013 a total of 160,000 camels were slaughtered, estimating the feral population to have been reduced to around 300,000. A post-kill analysis projected the original count to be around 600,000, an estimating error from the original number greater than the totality of the cull.

History  
 Camels had been used successfully in desert exploration in other parts of the world. The first suggestion of importing camels into Australia was made in 1822 by Danish-French geographer and journalist Conrad Malte-Brun, whose Universal Geography contains the following:

For such an expedition, men of science and courage ought to be selected. They ought to be provided with all sorts of implements and stores, and with different animals, from the powers and instincts of which they may derive assistance. They should have oxen from Buenos Aires, or from the English settlements, mules from Senegal, and dromedaries from Africa or Arabia. The oxen would traverse the woods and the thickets; the mules would walk securely among rugged rocks and hilly countries; the dromedaries would cross the sandy deserts. Thus the expedition would be prepared for any kind of territory that the interior might present. Dogs also should be taken to raise game, and to discover springs of water; and it has even been proposed to take pigs, for the sake of finding out esculent roots in the soil. When no kangaroos and game are to be found the party would subsist on the flesh of their own flocks. They should be provided with a balloon for spying at a distance any serious obstacle to their progress in particular directions, and for extending the range of observations which the eye would take of such level lands as are too wide to allow any heights beyond them to come within the compass of their view.

In 1839, Lieutenant-Colonel George Gawler, second Governor of South Australia, suggested that camels should be imported to work in the semi-arid regions of Australia.

The first camel arrived in Australia in 1840, ordered from the Canary Islands by the Phillips brothers of Adelaide (Henry Weston Phillips (1818–1898); George Phillips (1820–1900); G M Phillips (unknown)). The Apolline, under Captain William Deane, docked at Port Adelaide in South Australia on 12 October 1840, but all but one of the camels died on the voyage. The surviving camel was named Harry. This camel, Harry, was used for inland exploration by pastoralist and explorer John Ainsworth Horrocks on his ill-fated 1846 expedition into the arid South Australian interior near Lake Torrens, in searching for new agricultural land. He became known as the 'man who was shot by his own camel'. On 1 September Horrocks was preparing to shoot a bird on the shores of Lake Dutton. His kneeling camel moved while Horrocks was reloading his gun, causing the gun to fire and injuring the middle fingers of his right hand and a row of teeth. Horrocks died of his wounds on 23 September in Penwortham after requesting that the camel be shot.

"Afghan" cameleers
 

Australia's first major inland expedition to use camels as a main form of transport was the Burke and Wills expedition in 1860. The Victorian Government imported 24 camels for the expedition. The first cameleers arrived on 9 June 1860 at Port Melbourne from Karachi (then known as Kurrachee and then in British India) on the ship the Chinsurah, to participate in the expedition. As described by the Victorian Exploration Expedition Committee, "the camels would be comparatively useless unless accompanied by their native drivers". The cameleers on the expedition included 45-year-old Dost Mahomed, who was bitten by a bull camel, leading to the permanent loss of use of his right arm, and Esa (Hassam) Khan from Kalat, who fell ill near Swan Hill. They cared for the camels, loaded and unloaded equipment and provisions and located water on the expedition.

From the 1860s onward small groups of mainly Muslim cameleers were shipped in and out of Australia at three-year intervals, to service South Australia's inland pastoral industry. Carting goods and transporting wool bales by camel was a lucrative livelihood for them. As their knowledge of the Australian outback and economy increased, the cameleers began their own businesses, importing and running camel trains. By 1890 the camel business was dominated by the mostly Muslim merchants and brokers, commonly referred to as "Afghans" or "Ghans", despite their origin often being British India, as well as Afghanistan and Egypt and Turkey. They belonged to four main groups: Pashtuns, Baluchis, Punjabis, and Sindhis. At least 15,000 camels with their handlers are estimated to have come to Australia between 1870 and 1900. Most of these camels were dromedaries, especially from India, including the Bikaneri war camel from Rajasthan who used riding camels sourced from the Dervish wars in British Somaliland, and lowland Indian camels for heavy work. Other dromedaries included the Bishari riding camel of Somalia and Arabia.

Camel studs were set up in 1866, by Sir Thomas Elder and Samuel Stuckey, at Beltana and Umberatana Stations in South Australia. There was also a government stud camel farm at Londonderry, near Coolgardie in Western Australia, established in 1894. These studs operated for about 50 years and provided high-class breeders for the Australian camel trade.

Camels continued to be used for inland exploration by Peter Warburton in 1873, William Christie Gosse in 1873, Ernest Giles in 1875–76, David Lindsay in 1885–1886, Thomas Elder in 1891–1892, on the Calvert Expedition in 1896–97, and by Cecil Madigan in 1939. They were also used in the construction of the Overland Telegraph Line, and carried pipe sections for the Goldfields Water Supply Scheme.

The introduction of the Immigration Restriction Act 1901 and the White Australia policy made it more difficult for cameleers to enter Australia.

Camels go feral
With the departure of many cameleers in the early 20th century, and the introduction of motorised transportation in the 1920s and 1930s, some cameleers released their camels into the wild. Well suited to the arid conditions of Central Australia, these camels became the source for the large population of feral camels still existing today.

Camels and the Aboriginal people

Pitjantjatjara man Andy Tjilari (1925–2015) described camping with his family as a child, when a man traveling with camels arrived in search of dingo scalps. When the initial shock wore off, Tjilari describes following the camels with his family, mimicking them and talking to them. The discovery led him to assert that "this horse is ignorant".

As the Afghan cameleers increasingly travelled through the inland, they encountered a diversity of Aboriginal groups. An exchange of skills, knowledge and goods soon developed. Some cameleers assisted Aboriginal people by carrying traditional exchange goods, including red ochre or the narcotic plant pituri, along ancient trade routes such as the Birdsville Track. The cameleers also brought new commodities such as sugar, tea, tobacco, clothing and metal tools to remote Aboriginal groups. Aboriginal people incorporated camel hair into their traditional string artefacts, and provided information on desert waters and plant resources. Some cameleers employed Aboriginal men and women to assist them on their long desert treks. This resulted in some enduring partnerships, and several marriages.

From 1928 to 1933, the missionary Ernest Kramer undertook camel safaris in Central Australia with the aim of spreading the gospel. On most journeys, he employed Arrernte man Mickey Dow Dow as cameleer, guide and translator and sometimes a man called Barney. The first of Kramer's trips was to the Musgrave Ranges and Mann Ranges, and was sponsored by the Aborigines Friends Association, which sought a report on Indigenous living conditions. According to Kramer's biography, as the men travelled through the desert and encountered local people, they handed them boiled sweets, tea and sugar and played Jesus Loves Me on the gramophone. At night, using a "magic lantern projector", Kramer showed slides of Christmas and the life of Christ. For many people, this was their first experience of Christmas and the event picturesquely established "an association between camels, gifts and Christianity that was not merely symbolic but had material reality".

By the 1930s, as the cameleers became displaced by motor transport, an opportunity arose for Aboriginal people. They learnt camel-handling skills and acquired their own animals, extending their mobility and independence in a rapidly changing frontier society. This continued until at least the late 1960s. A documentary film, Camels and the Pitjantjara, made by Roger Sandall, shot in 1968 and released in 1969, follows a group of Pitjantjara men who travel out from their base at Areyonga Settlement to capture a wild camel, tame it and add it to their domestic herds. They then use camels to help transport a large group of people from Areyonga to Papunya, three days walk.

Camels appear in Indigenous Australian art, with examples held in collections of the National Museum of Australia and Museums Victoria.

Various Australian Aboriginal languages have adopted a word for the camel, including Eastern Arrernte (kamule), Pitjantjatjara (kamula) and Alyawarr (kamwerl).

Management
Australia has the largest population of feral camels and the only herd of dromedary (one-humped) camels exhibiting wild behaviour in the world. In 2008, the number of feral camels was estimated to be more than one million, with the capability of doubling in number every 8 to 10 years. In 2013, this estimate was revised to a population of 600,000 prior to culling operations, and around 300,000 camels after culling, with an annual growth of 10% per year.

Impacts of feral camels

Impact on the environment

Although their impact on the environment is not as severe as some other pests introduced in Australia, camels ingest more than 80% of the plant species available. Degradation of the environment occurs when densities exceed two animals per square kilometre, which is presently the case throughout much of their range in the Northern Territory where they are confined to two main regions: the Simpson Desert and the western desert area of the Central Ranges, Great Sandy Desert and Tanami Desert. Some traditional food plants harvested by Aboriginal people in these areas are seriously affected by camel-browsing. While having soft-padded feet makes soil erosion less likely, they do destabilise dune crests, which can contribute to erosion. Feral camels do have a noticeable impact on salt lake ecosystems, and have been found to foul waterholes.

The National Feral Camel Action Plan (see below) cited the following environmental impacts: "broad landscape damage including damage to vegetation through foraging behaviour and trampling, suppression of recruitment of some plant species, selective browsing on rare and threatened flora, damage to wetlands through fouling, trampling and sedimentation, competition with native animals for food and shelter and loss of sequestered carbon in vegetation".

Some researchers think feral camels may actually benefit ecologically by filling lost niches of extinct Australian megafauna, such as Diprotodon  and Palorchestes, and may contribute to decline wildfires; a theory similar in a way to the concepts of Pleistocene rewilding. 

Camels can be an effective counter against introduced weeds.

Impact on infrastructure
Camels can do significant damage to infrastructure such as taps, pumps, and toilets, as a means to obtain water, particularly in times of severe drought. They can smell water at a distance of up to five kilometres, and are even attracted by moisture condensed by air conditioners. They also damage stock fences and cattle watering points. These effects are felt particularly in Aboriginal and other remote communities where the costs of repairs are prohibitive.

Decaying bodies of camels that have been trampled by their herd in their search for water near human settlements can cause further problems.

Economic impact
The National Feral Camel Action Plan (see below) cited the following economic impacts: "direct control and management costs, damage to infrastructure (fences, yards, grazing lands, water sources), competition with cattle for food and water, cattle escapes due to fencing damage, destruction of bush tucker resources".

Social impact
The National Feral Camel Action Plan (see below) cited the following social impacts: "damage to culturally significant sites including religious sites, burial sites, ceremonial grounds, water places (e.g. water holes, rockholes, soaks, springs), places of birth, places (including trees) where spirits of dead people are said to dwell and resource points (food, ochre, flints), destruction of bush tucker resources, changes in patterns of exploitation and customary use of country and loss of opportunities to teach younger generations, reduction of people’s enjoyment of natural areas, interference with native animals or hunting of native animals, creation of dangerous driving conditions, cause of general nuisance in residential areas, cause of safety concerns to do with feral camels on airstrips, damage to outstations, damage to community infrastructure, community costs associated with traffic accidents".

Northern Territory cull, 2009
Drought conditions in Australia during the first decade of the 21st century (the "Millennium drought") were particularly harsh, leading to thousands of camels dying of thirst in the outback. The problem of invading camels searching for water became great enough for the Northern Territory Government to plan to eradicate as many as 6,000 camels that had become a nuisance in the community of Docker River, 500km south west of Alice Springs in the Northern Territory, where the camels were causing severe damage in their search for food and water. The planned cull was reported internationally and drew a strong reaction.

National Feral Camel Action Plan, 2009–2013

The Australian Feral Camel Management Project (AFCMP) was established in 2009 and ran until 2013. It aimed to work with landholders to build their capacity to manage feral camels while reducing impacts at key environmental and cultural sites. The project was expected to be completed by June 2013 but received a six-month extension. It was completed A$4 million under budget.

It was a collaboration between nineteen key partners: the Governments of Australia, Western Australia, South Australia, Northern Territory and Queensland; Central Land Council, Anangu Pitjantjatjara Yankunytjatjara Lands, Ngaanyatjarra Council Inc., Kanyirninpa Jukurrpa, Pila Nguru Aboriginal Corporation, Kimberley Land Council and Western Desert Lands Aboriginal Corporation; South Australian Arid Lands NRM, Alinytjara Wilurara NRM Board, Natural Resource Management Board NT Inc. and Rangelands NRM WA; Northern Territory Cattlemen's Association; Australian Camel Industry Association; RSPCA; Australian Wildlife Conservancy; CSIRO; and Flinders University.

In November 2010 the Australian Government Department of Environment released the National Feral Camel Action Plan, a national management plan for what it defined an 'Established Pest of National Significance' in accordance with its Australian Pest Animal Strategy.

Ninti One and its partners gained consent for the culling program from the landholders for over  square kilometres of land. Different culling techniques were used for different regions in deference to concerns from the Aboriginal landholders.

At the completion of the project in 2013, the Australian Feral Camel Management Project had reduced the feral camel population by 160,000 camels. This includes over 130,000 through aerial culling, 15,000 mustered and 12,000 ground-culled (shot from vehicle) for pet meat. It estimated around 300,000 camels remained, the population increasing 10% per year. The largest individual aerial cull operation was conducted in mid-2012 in the south-west of the Northern Territory. It employed three R44 helicopter cull platforms in combination with two R22 helicopter spotting/mustering platforms. It removed 11,560 feral camels in 280 operational hours over 12 days, over 45,000 square kilometres, at a cost of around $30 per head.

The project faced criticism from some parts of the Australian camel industry, who wanted to see the feral population harvested for meat processing, the pet-meat market, or live export, arguing it would reduce waste and create jobs. Poor animal condition, high cost of freight, the lack of infrastructure in remote locations, and difficulty in gaining the necessary permissions on Aboriginal land are some of the challenges faced by the camel industry.

No ongoing funding has been committed to the program.

2020 APY lands cull
As a result of widespread heat, drought and the 2019–20 Australian bushfire season, feral camels were impinging more on human settlements, especially remote Aboriginal communities. In the APY lands of South Australia, they roamed the streets, damaging buildings and infrastructure in their search for water. They were also destroying native vegetation, contaminating water supplies and destroying cultural sites. On 8 January 2020 the South Australian Department for Environment and Water began a five-day cull of the camels, the first mass cull of camels in the area. Professional shooters would kill between 4,000 to 5,000 camels from helicopters, "...in accordance with the highest standards of animal welfare".

Camel industry

Camel meat
Camel meat is consumed in Australia.

A multi-species abattoir at Caboolture in Queensland run by Meramist regularly processes feral camels, selling meat into Europe, the United States, and Japan. Samex Australian Meat Company in Peterborough, South Australia, also resumed processing feral camels in 2012. It is regularly supplied by an Indigenous camel company run by Ngaanyatjarra Council on the Ngaanyatjarra Lands in Western Australia and by camels mustered on the Anangu Pitjantjatjara Yankunytjatjara (APY) Lands of South Australia. A small abattoir on Bond Springs Station just north of Alice Springs also processes small quantities of camels when operational.

Camel meat was also used in the production of pet food in Australia. In 2011, the RSPCA issued a warning, after a study found cases of severe and sometimes fatal liver disease in dogs that had eaten camel meat containing the amino acid indospicine, present within some species of a genus of plants known as Indigofera.

Live camels are occasionally exported to Saudi Arabia, the United Arab Emirates, Brunei, and Malaysia, where disease-free wild camels are prized as a delicacy. Australia's camels are also exported as breeding stock for Arab camel racing stables, and for use in tourist venues in places such as the United States. Exports to Saudi Arabia where camel meat is consumed began in 2002.

Camel milk

Australia's first commercial-scale camel dairy, Australian Wild Camel Corporation, was established in 2015 in Clarendon, Queensland. There are a number of smaller-scale camel dairies, some growing fast: QCamel in Central Queensland, in New South Wales' Upper Hunter District, Camel Milk Australia in South Burnett, Queensland, and Australian Camel Dairies near Perth in Western Australia. The Camel Milk Company in northern Victoria has grown from three wild camels in 2014 to over 300 in 2019, and exports mostly to Singapore, with shipments of both fresh and powdered product set to start to Thailand and Malaysia.

Tourism
Camel farms offering rides or treks to tourists include Kings Creek Station near Uluru, Calamunnda Camel Farm in Western Australia, Camels Australia at Stuart Well, south of Alice Springs, and Pyndan Camel Tracks in Alice Springs. Camel rides are offered on the beach at Victor Harbor in South Australia and on Cable Beach in Broome, Western Australia.

There are also two popular camel racing events in Central Australia, the Camel Cup in Alice Springs and the Uluru Camel Cup at Uluru Camel Tours at Uluru.

See also 

 Dromedary
 Cameleers
 Camel train
 Camel meat
 The Great Australian Camel Race, an Australian event held in 1988 to recognise the positive impact that camels had on the development of Australia

References

Further reading 

 Distribution and abundance of the feral camel (Camelus dromedarius) in Australia
 Camels Down Under, archived. Arthur Clark. pages 16–23 of the January/February 1988 print edition of Saudi Aramco World.
 National Feral Camel Action Plan
 Camels Australia Export Camel Industry Association website.

Animal culling
Camels
Fauna naturalised in Australia
Feral animals
Invasive animal species in Australia
Camel
Introduced mammals of Australia